Thelymitra erosa, commonly called the striped sun orchid, is a species of orchid that is endemic to Tasmania. It has a single erect, fleshy dark green leaf and up to eight moderately large dark blue to purplish or pink flowers with darker veins. The column arms have irregular lobes.

Description
The lobe on the top of the anther has a few small lumps on its back and the side lobes are white or yellow and have irregular lobes. Flowering occurs from October to December and is more prolific after fire the previous summer. The flowers are insect pollinated and open on warm days.

Taxonomy and naming
Thelymitra erosa was first formally described in 1998 by David Jones and Mark Clements from a specimen collected near Blackmans Bay and the description was published in Australian Orchid Research. The specific epithet (erosa) is a Latin word meaning “eaten away", "consumed", or "corroded", referring to the irregular edges of the column arms.

Distribution and habitat
The striped sun orchid grows in coastal heath in moist places, often on the edge of tracks and is only found in Tasmania.

References

External links
 

erosa
Endemic orchids of Australia
Orchids of Tasmania
Plants described in 1998